Charles Payne (31 July 1876 – 28 January 1938) was an Australian cricketer. He played four first-class matches for Tasmania between 1907 and 1913.

See also
 List of Tasmanian representative cricketers

References

External links
 

1876 births
1938 deaths
Australian cricketers
Tasmania cricketers
Cricketers from Hobart